The Stockton Waterfront Events Center is a commercial complex in Stockton, California on the Stockton waterfront. Also known as the Waterfront Entertainment Complex, it includes the 12,000-seat Stockton Arena, the 5,000-seat Banner Island Ballpark, a Sheraton Hotel and Conference Center, a 592-stall parking structure, and commercial/retail space. The Stockton Waterfront Events Center is part of a massive revitalization project that will include a marina, high-rise condominiums, and the Downtown Transit Center.

References

Tourist attractions in San Joaquin County, California
Buildings and structures in Stockton, California